The WFTDA Western Regional Tournament or WFTDA West Region Playoffs was one of four roller derby qualifying tournaments for the WFTDA Championships.

The Tournament was organised by the Women's Flat Track Derby Association (WFTDA). Full WFTDA members in the Western Region members were eligible for ranking, and the top ten leagues would qualify for the Western Regional Tournament, with the top three finalists qualifying for the Championships. Together, the four qualifying tournaments and Championships were termed the "Big 5". Starting with the 2013 WFTDA season, WFTDA's regions were discontinued in favor of an overall-rankings based system, and a new playoff format was created.

Championships

2007 Dust Devil
On February 16, 2007, the Rat City Rollergirls beat Tucson Roller Derby 83–72 in the finals of the Western Regional Tournament, the Dust Devil, held in Tucson, Arizona. The previous year, Tucson Roller Derby had hosted the first Dust Devil tournament, considered the first national roller derby tournament, placing second.

2008 Battle Royale
On October 3, 2008, the Texas Rollergirls Texecutioners beat the B.ay A.rea D.erby Girls BAD Girls 135-59 in the championship bout. Rat City Rollergirls beat the Duke City Derby Muñecas Muertas 158-95 in the consolation bout to take third place.

2009 Derby On the Rocks Tournament
On October 4, 2009, the Oly Rollers' Cosa Nostra Donnas defeated the Rocky Mountain Rollergirls' 5280 Fight Club 119-64 in the West championship bout. The Denver Roller Dolls' Mile High Club beat the Rat City Rollergirls 172-94 to place third.

References

Recurring sporting events established in 2007
West Region (WFTDA)
Roller derby competitions
Women's Flat Track Derby Association